Basic Education High School No. 2 Bahan (abbreviated to အ.ထ.က (၂) ဗဟန်း; commonly known as Nanyan) is a public high school in Bahan township, Yangon. Until the nationalization under Ne Win's government occurred in 1963, it was the location of Nanyang High School (缅甸南洋中学), one of the elite Chinese schools in Burma.

Student Body
The school has a large student body, numbering near 4000. The students are spread across six standards or grades, from Grade 6 (formerly fifth standard) to Grade 11 (formerly tenth standard). A high student-to-teacher ratio exists like most of the schools in Yangon.

Buildings and facilities

 7 two-storied buildings (each having 6-10 classrooms and 2 teachers' common room)
 Multimedia classrooms (Computer and Language Lab)
 Principal's office
 Shwe Nanyan Hall (used for special occasions and ceremonies)
 Physics, Chemistry and Biology Laboratories
 Library
 Canteen
 Assembly hall
 Field 
 Netball court
 Tuckshop

External links 
 BEHS 2 Bahan website
 BEHS 2 Bahan (Nan Yan)

High schools in Yangon